Blastocatella is a genus of bacteria from the family of Blastocatellaceae with one known species (Blastocatella fastidiosa). Blastocatella fastidiosa has been isolated from savanna soil from Erichsfelde in Namibia.

References

Bacteria genera
Monotypic bacteria genera
Acidobacteriota
Taxa described in 2013
Bacteria described in 2013